American United is a Ranger-class Robert Allan Ltd. designed fireboat built to serve the Massachusetts Port Authority as a replacement to Massport Marine Unit 1, the Howard W. Fitzpatrick.  It was scheduled to be placed in service in June 2011, and was delivered October 11, 2011, due to the complexity of the build.

Manufacturing
The American United was built by A.F. Theriault and Son Ltd. of Meteghan River, Nova Scotia

Purpose
The vessel is intended to support Logan Airport firefighting, search and rescue, EMS, and Port Security capability.

References

2011 ships
Fireboats of the United States
Massachusetts Port Authority
Service vessels of the United States